Elimu Nelson (pronounced Ee-lii-muu, meaning knowledge and education in Swahili) is a film and television actor. His latest film in which he has a major role is Love Don't Cost a Thing. He has had supporting roles in movies such as Dance Flick, Love & Sex, The Hard Easy, and Unspeakable.

He has made television guest-starring appearances on Pacific Blue, Undressed, JAG, The Practice and City of Angels and the TNT feature Passing Glory.

Early life
Nelson was born in Orange, New Jersey of African American descent, but raised in Milton, Massachusetts. The elder of two, he excelled in basketball and soccer at an early age. Elimu attended Milton High School and graduated in 1991. Elimu then graduated from Syracuse with a Bachelor of Science in Speech Communication, with a concentration in African American Studies and Spanish. After graduation he made his way to Los Angeles after a brief stint in NYC. Upon arriving in LA he hit the ground running with some commercial work and guest appearances on television shows such as: Pacific Blue, Undressed, JAG, The Practice and City of Angels. He also guest starred in The Shield as Derrick Tripp. He is currently working on future projects and living in Burbank, CA.

Filmography
Passing Glory (1999) (TV)...Touché
Love & Sex (2000)...Jerome Davis
What About Your Friends: Weekend Getaway (2002)...Nikko
The Shield (2002)...Derrick Tripp
Love Don't Cost a Thing (2003)...Dru Hilton
The Hard Easy (2005)...Stephen McKinley
Private Practice (2007) (TV)...Greg O'Brien - In Which Sam Receives an Unexpected Visitor...
Unspeakable (2007)...Neal Knox
Dance Flick (2009)...Prison Guard
 Fugue (2010)...Terry
The Game (2012) (TV)...Adisa Edwards - The Black People Episode
My Favorite Five (2015)...Peter
Modern Family (2015) (TV)...Officer Clemons - The Big Guns

External links

Living people
American male actors
Basketball players from New Jersey
Guards (basketball)
People from Orange, New Jersey
Sportspeople from Essex County, New Jersey
Syracuse Orange men's basketball players
American men's basketball players
1973 births